Life Is Most Important is a 1987 Mexican drama film directed by Luis Alcoriza. It was entered into the 15th Moscow International Film Festival. The film was selected as the Mexican entry for the Best Foreign Language Film at the 60th Academy Awards, but did not garner a nomination.

Cast
 Gonzalo Vega as Candelario
 Ernesto Gómez Cruz as Lázaro
 María Rojo as Chabela
 Loló Navarro as Mamá Rosita
 Alejandro Parodi as Canales
 Justo Martínez as Gabriel
 Eduardo Borja as Padre Aurelio
 Bruno Rey as Comandante
 Ramón Menéndez as Gregorio

Accolades

See also
 List of submissions to the 60th Academy Awards for Best Foreign Language Film
 List of Mexican submissions for the Academy Award for Best Foreign Language Film

References

External links
 

1987 films
1987 drama films
1980s Spanish-language films
Films directed by Luis Alcoriza
Mexican drama films
1980s Mexican films